Nottawa Township is a civil township of Isabella County in the U.S. state of Michigan. The population was 2,278 at the 2000 census. The township is named for a local Chippewa (Ojibwa) chief who lived from 1781 to 1881.

Communities 
 Beal City is an unincorporated community and census-designated place within the township.

Geography
According to the United States Census Bureau, the township has a total area of 36.0 square miles (93.1 km), of which 35.3 square miles (91.6 km) is land and 0.6 square mile (1.6 km) (1.70%) is water.

Demographics
As of the census of 2000, there were 2,278 people, 846 households, and 620 families residing in the township. The racial makeup of the township was 97.06% White, 0.09% African American, 2.15% Native American, 0.04% Asian, 0.09% from other races, and 0.57% from two or more races. Hispanic or Latino of any race were 0.79% of the population.

There were 846 households, out of which 36.9% had children under the age of 18 living with them, 62.5% were married couples living together, 6.6% had a female householder with no husband present, and 26.7% were non-families. 21.7% of all households were made up of individuals, and 7.3% had someone living alone who was 65 years of age or older.  The average household size was 2.69 and the average family size was 3.15.

In the township the population was spread out, with 28.7% under the age of 18, 8.1% from 18 to 24, 31.1% from 25 to 44, 20.7% from 45 to 64, and 11.5% who were 65 years of age or older.  The median age was 35 years. For every 100 females, there were 102.0 males.  For every 100 females age 18 and over, there were 104.1 males.

The median income for a household in the township was $40,766, and the median income for a family was $46,523. Males had a median income of $31,798 versus $26,438 for females. The per capita income for the township was $18,340.  About 4.6% of families and 6.5% of the population were below the poverty line, including 4.5% of those under age 18 and 5.0% of those age 65 or over.

References

Townships in Isabella County, Michigan
Townships in Michigan